Adama Traoré (born 5 June 1995), also known as Adama Malouda Traoré, is a Malian professional footballer who plays as a winger for Nemzeti Bajnokság I club Ferencváros and the Mali national team.

Club career

TP Mazembe  
In 2011, Traoré joined the youth ranks of Olympique Bamako, and in summer 2013 joined TP Mazembe. He made his CAF Champions League debut in a 0–0 draw to Egyptian side Zamalek in the 2014 CAF Champions League group stage. On 10 August 2014, he scored his first goal in the CAF Champions League, in a 3–1 home win against Sudanese club Al-Hilal. Next season, he helped Mazembe win a 5th continental title, playing in both the legs of the final against USM Alger, coming close in the second match when his shot from close range missed the target narrowly. Mazembe thus qualified for the 2015 FIFA Club World Cup in Japan, where they finished 6th after losing to Sanfrecce Hiroshima and América.

On 20 February 2016, he won the 2016 CAF Super Cup, after a 2–1 win over Tunisian side Étoile du Sahel. In the 2016 season, after losing 3–1 on aggregate to Wydad Casablanca, Mazembe qualified for the 2016 CAF Confederation Cup play-off round where they faced Stade Gabèsien. He made his CAF Confederation Cup debut in the first leg against Gabèsien and was subbed out in the 69th minute for Déo Kanda. Mazembe eventually went all the way and on 6 November 2016 won their first Confederation Cup title after defeating MO Béjaïa in the final. Mazembe retained the Confederation Cup next season, when they defeated Supersport United in the final. Traoré scored in the first leg when his strike made its way through a crowd of players leaving Ronwen Williams very little time to react. Traoré also won the 2013–14, 2015–16 and 2016–17 league seasons with Mazembe.

Metz  
On 20 August 2018, Traoré joined French club FC Metz on a four-year deal. He made his Ligue 2 debut on 17 September, coming on as an 87th minute substitute for Opa Nguette in a 3–1 away victory over Béziers. In January 2019, he was loaned to Orléans of the same league until the end of the season.

Traoré was loaned to Al-Adalah FC of the Saudi Professional League on 19 January 2020, for the rest of the season. In July, the loan was extended until September so he could finish the season which had been interrupted by the COVID-19 pandemic.

Sheriff Tiraspol 
On 10 February 2021, Traoré signed for Sheriff Tiraspol.

On 15 September 2021, Traoré scored against FC Shakhtar Donetsk in what was Sheriff Tiraspol's first ever UEFA Champions League match. The team went on to win 2–0.

International career
Traoré was part of the Mali under-20 team who participated in the 2013 FIFA U-20 World Cup in Turkey. He only played one match where he was withdrawn at half time for Tiécoro Keita, in a 4–1 defeat against Mexico, as Mali went down in the group stage.

On 6 July 2013, Traoré made his national team debut in a 3–1 2014 CHAN qualification win over Guinea. On 6 January 2014, he was named in Mali's 23-man squad for the 2014 African Nations Championship. Five days later, he scored his first ever senior international goal in the 2–1 opening match win against Nigeria, nutmegging keeper Chigozie Agbim in a 2–1 win. After topping the group ahead of Nigeria, Mali were knocked out of the tournament in the quarter-finals, 2–1 by Zimbabwe. In November 2015, Traoré was named in Mali's 21-man squad for the 2015 Africa U-23 Cup of Nations in Senegal.

On 16 June 2019, he was named in Mali's 23-man squad for the 2019 Africa Cup of Nations in Egypt. On 24 June 2019, he scored in his side's 4–1 opening match win against Mauritania, coming on in the 61st minute for Adama Traoré II.

Personal life
Traoré was an international teammate of a player of the same name, who was born in the same month. The two were also at Metz at the same time. To distinguish between them, the latter was also known as Adama Noss Traoré.

Career statistics

Club

International

Scores and results list Mali's goal tally first, score column indicates score after each Traoré goal.

Honours
TP Mazembe
 Linafoot: 2013–14, 2015–16, 2016–17
 CAF Champions League: 2015
 CAF Confederation Cup: 2016, 2017
 CAF Super Cup: 2016
Sheriff Tiraspol

 Moldovan National Division: 2021–22
 Moldovan Cup: 2021–22

References

External links

Adama Traoré at the official Metz site

1995 births
Living people
Sportspeople from Bamako
Malian footballers
Association football wingers
CO de Bamako players
FC Metz players
TP Mazembe players
US Orléans players
Al-Adalah FC players
FC Sheriff Tiraspol players
Ferencvárosi TC footballers
Ligue 2 players
Saudi Professional League players
Moldovan Super Liga players
Nemzeti Bajnokság I players
Malian expatriate footballers
Malian expatriate sportspeople in France
Malian expatriate sportspeople in the Democratic Republic of the Congo
Malian expatriate sportspeople in Saudi Arabia
Malian expatriate sportspeople in Moldova
Malian expatriate sportspeople in Hungary
Expatriate footballers in France
Expatriate footballers in the Democratic Republic of the Congo
Expatriate footballers in Saudi Arabia
Expatriate footballers in Moldova
Expatriate footballers in Hungary
Mali under-20 international footballers
Mali international footballers
2014 African Nations Championship players
2019 Africa Cup of Nations players
2021 Africa Cup of Nations players
Mali A' international footballers